Franco Lautaro Costa (born 10 December 1991) is an Argentine professional footballer who plays as a midfielder for General Caballero JLM.

Career
Costa's career started with Luján, prior to moving to Arsenal de Sarandí in 2013. In that same year, he was loaned out to Primera B Metropolitana side Flandria for six months. He returned to Arsenal in 2015 and featured in eight Argentine Primera División fixtures, including his debut for the club in a 0–0 draw with Lanús on 8 March. He was subsequently, in July, sent out on loan once again, this time to Tristán Suárez of Primera B Metropolitana. He scored six goals in thirteen games for Tristán Suárez. In January 2017, Costa almost joined China League One club Nei Mongol Zhongyou. However, the move fell through.

Costa subsequently rejoined former side Flandria, now in Primera B Nacional. On 2 August, Costa left Flandria to join San Martín. His debut came against Ferro Carril Oeste on 16 September in Primera B Nacional, it was also his 100th career league appearance. Costa signed for Paraguayan Primera División side Nacional in January 2019, having terminated his San Martín contract.

Career statistics
.

References

External links
 

1991 births
Living people
People from Luján, Buenos Aires
Argentine footballers
Association football midfielders
Argentine expatriate footballers
Expatriate footballers in Paraguay
Argentine expatriate sportspeople in Paraguay
Primera C Metropolitana players
Argentine Primera División players
Primera B Metropolitana players
Primera Nacional players
Club Luján footballers
Arsenal de Sarandí footballers
Flandria footballers
CSyD Tristán Suárez footballers
San Martín de Tucumán footballers
Club Nacional footballers
Club Sol de América footballers
Sportspeople from Buenos Aires Province